Roger Campbell Beetham  (22 November 1937 – 19 September 2009) was a British diplomat

Beetham was educated at Peter Symonds College and Brasenose College, Oxford. He joined HM Diplomatic Service in 1960. He was Head of Chancery at the British Embassy in Helsinki from 1972, before being seconded to the European Commission in Brussels, where he served as spokesman for Roy Jenkins, who was then President of the Commission.

He then served consecutively as Counsellor (Economic and Commercial) in New Delhi (1981-1985); Head of Maritime, Aviation and Environment Department at the Foreign Office in London (1985-1990); Ambassador to Senegal (1990-1993); and finally Permanent Representative to the Council of Europe (1993-1997).

Honours
  Companion of the Order of St Michael and St George (CMG) - 1993
  Lieutenant of the Royal Victorian Order (LVO) - 1976

References

1937 births
Members of HM Diplomatic Service
People educated at Peter Symonds College
Alumni of Brasenose College, Oxford
2009 deaths
Lieutenants of the Royal Victorian Order
Companions of the Order of St Michael and St George
Ambassadors of the United Kingdom to Senegal
20th-century British diplomats